The Rønnbeck Islands are a group of islands in Hinlopen Strait, Svalbard. They are located south of the Bastian Islands, southeast of Wilhelm Island. The islands are named after Norwegian sailor and seal hunter Nils Fredrik Rønnbeck.

References

Islands of Svalbard